18th CDG Awards
February 23, 2016

Contemporary: 
Beasts of No Nation

Fantasy: 
Mad Max: Fury Road

Period: 
The Danish Girl
The 18th Costume Designers Guild Awards, honouring the best costume designs in film and television for 2015, were given in 2016. The nominees were announced on January 7, 2016.

Winners and nominees

Film

Excellence in Contemporary Film
 Winner - Beasts of No Nation - Jenny Eagan Joy - Michael Wilkinson
 Kingsman: The Secret Service - Arianne Phillips
 The Martian - Janty Yates
 Youth - Carlo Poggioli

Excellence in Fantasy Film
 Winner - Mad Max: Fury Road - Jenny Beavan Cinderella - Sandy Powell
 Ex Machina - Sammy Sheldon Differ
 The Hunger Games: Mockingjay – Part 2 - Kurt Swanson and Bart Mueller
 Star Wars: The Force Awakens - Michael Kaplan

Excellence in Period Film
 Winner - The Danish Girl - Paco Delgado Brooklyn - Odile Dicks-Mireaux
 Carol - Sandy Powell
 Crimson Peak - Kate Hawley
 Trumbo - Daniel Orlandi

Television

Outstanding Contemporary Television Series
 Winner - American Horror Story: Hotel - Lou Eyrich Empire, Season 1 - Rita McGhee
 House of Cards - Johanna Argan, Kemal Harris
 Ray Donovan - Christopher Lawrence
 Transparent - Marie Schley

Outstanding Fantasy Television Series
 Winner - Game of Thrones - Michele Clapton Once Upon a Time - Eduardo Castro
 Sleepy Hollow, Season 2 - Kristin M. Burke, Mairi Chisholm
 Sleepy Hollow, Season 3 - Mairi Chisholm
 The Wiz Live! - Paul Tazewell

Outstanding Period Television Series
 Winner - The Knick'' - Ellen Mirojnick
 Mad Men - Janie Bryant, Tiffany White Stanton
 Masters of Sex - Isis Mussenden
 Outlander - Terry Dresbach
 Penny Dreadful - Gabriella Pescucci

Short Film

Excellence in Short Form Design

 Winner - '"The Most Interesting Man in the World Wins on Land, Sea & Air," Dos Equis Commercial – Julie Vogel
 "And So It Begins," Old Spice Commercial – Mindy Le Brock
 "From the Makers of Happy & Merry, H&M Presents Katy Perry" Commercial – B. Åkerlund
 The Hobbit: Kingdoms of Middle-earth – Dance Battle, Video Game, Kaboom/Warner Interactive Commercial – Soyon An
 Kevin Spacey, E-Trade Commercial – Johanna Argan

References

Costume Designers Guild Awards
2015 film awards
2015 television awards
2015 guild awards
2015 in fashion
2016 in American cinema
2016 in American television